North Carolina Highway 49 (NC 49) is a 177.8-mile (286.1 km) primary state highway in the U.S. state of North Carolina. It traverses much of the Piedmont region, connecting the cities of Charlotte, Asheboro, and Burlington.

Route description
The highway is part of a three-state highway 49 system, entering North Carolina near Lake Wylie, south of Charlotte, and exiting the state near Virgilina, Virginia on the Virginia state line.

The route is an important corridor for traffic as it forms a part of the shortest route between the two largest cities in the Carolinas: Charlotte, and the North Carolina state capital of Raleigh. in Asheboro, NC 49 meets US 64, which forms the majority of the Charlotte-Raleigh link.

From where it enters the state, the highway passes through Charlotte (where it follows most of Tryon Street and the uptown portion of Graham Street) and after crossing the more suburban portions of western Cabarrus County, heads northeast into Stanly County. From uptown Charlotte to University City NC 49 is concurrent with US 29. After passing Mount Pleasant in eastern Cabarrus County, the road becomes a designated North Carolina Scenic Byway. The route passes close to Pfeiffer University in Stanly County before crossing the Yadkin River near the Tuckertown Reservoir. After crossing the river, the road skirts the northern foothills of the ancient Uwharrie Mountains and then drops down into the Asheboro area.

In western Asheboro, NC 49 joins US 64 for a  stretch through Asheboro and the outskirts of Franklinville. In Ramseur, the two routes split; NC 49 goes north through the towns of Liberty and Alamance and into Burlington, where it meets I-40/I-85. A concurrency of NC 49 and US 70 winds through Burlington before the two routes diverge at Haw River, where NC 49 heads north. In northern Alamance County, NC 49 meets NC 62 at a 4-way at-grade junction. The two routes switch directions at this point; NC 49 turns east toward Roxboro. After passing through Roxboro and a short interval of concurrency with US 158 and US 501, NC 49 continues on toward the Virginia state line.

History
Established in late 1934 as a renumbering of NC 15, it traversed from Lake Wylie to Morehead and Tryon Street, in Charlotte, where it connected with US 21/US 29/US 74/NC 27. In 1940, NC 49 was extended northeast from Charlotte to the Virginia state line, near Virgilina, Virginia; its routing went as follows:  In Charlotte, it was overlapped with US 29 along Tryon Street and Old Concord Road. Traveling through Concord, via Old Charlotte Road, it then overlaps with NC 73 to Mount Pleasant. Replacing NC 62, it travels northeast, through Richfield and Farmer, to Asheboro. With a brief overlap with US 220 (Fayetteville Street), it continues its northeasterly along Old Liberty road, replacing NC 62, through Liberty, Graham, Haw River, to Pleasant Grove. Going east from Pleasant Grove, NC 49 replaced NC 144, through Roxboro, to the Virginia state line, near Virgilina.

In or by 1947, NC 49 was rerouted in Richfield, removing a concurrency with US 52. And in Asheboro, NC 49 was rerouted onto US 64 to Ramseur, then northeast to Liberty; its old alignment becoming NC 49A.

In 1949, NC 49 was rerouted in Roxboro from Main Street onto newly constructed Madison Boulevard. In 1953, NC 49 was given its modern routing bypassing Concord and a concurrency with NC 73; that same year, in the Charlotte area, it was moved from Old Concord Road to University City Boulevard. Around 1960, NC 49 was given a new alignment south of Farmer, in Randolph County. By 1962, in Roxboro, NC 49 was removed along Morgan Street and Concord Road to an overlap with US 158 on Leasburg Road.

In 1982, NC 49, in concurrency with US 29, was rerouted in Uptown Charlotte from Tryon Street onto Morehead and Graham Streets, cutting back onto Tryon Street via Dalton Avenue.  By 1993, NC 49 was adjusted in Pleasant Grove to intersect with NC 62; before it would turn nearby without connecting. In 2004, NC 49/NC 57 was rerouted from a section of Leasburg Road onto Long Avenue, in Roxboro.

North Carolina Highway 15

North Carolina Highway 15 (NC 15) was an original state highway, established in 1921. It began at the intersection of Trade and Tryon Street in Charlotte, connecting with NC 20/NC 27, traversing northeast along Tryon Street and Old Concord Road to Harrisburg and Concord. From Concord, it went north through Kannapolis and Landis before ending in Salisbury at Main and Innes Street, connecting with NC 10/NC 80. In 1927, US 170 was assigned on all of NC 15. By 1930, NC 15 was extended south on Tryon Street/York Road to SC 163, at Lake Wylie. In 1932, US 170 was renumbered as an extension of US 29. In 1934, because of US 15 establishing in the state, NC 15 was removed on all sections overlapping with US 29 and the remaining section was renumbered to NC 49.

Major intersections

Special routes

New London alternate route

North Carolina Highway 49A (NC 49A) was established as a renumbering of NC 62A. A spur route of NC 49, it went south near the Tuckertown Reservoir to New London, connecting with US 52/NC 740 on Gold Street. In 1948, it was renumbered to NC 6; it later became part of NC 8 in 1953.

Asheboro–Liberty alternate route

North Carolina Highway 49A (NC 49A) was established after mainline NC 49 was rerouted onto US 64 from Asheboro to Ramseur, then northeast to Liberty; NC 49A continued the old alignment through Asheboro via Albemarle Avenue, Park Street, Salisbury Street, and Fayetteville Street. North of Asheboro it followed Old Liberty Road to Liberty. On November, 1967, NC 49A was decommissioned, most of which (except for Fayetteville Street) becoming secondary roads.

References

External links

NCRoads.com: N.C. 15
NCRoads.com: N.C. 49

049
Transportation in Charlotte, North Carolina
Transportation in Mecklenburg County, North Carolina
Transportation in Cabarrus County, North Carolina
Transportation in Stanly County, North Carolina
Transportation in Rowan County, North Carolina
Transportation in Davidson County, North Carolina
Transportation in Randolph County, North Carolina
Transportation in Alamance County, North Carolina
Transportation in Orange County, North Carolina
Transportation in Caswell County, North Carolina
Transportation in Person County, North Carolina
Transportation in Granville County, North Carolina